Baby et Lulu is an Australian chanteuse duo of Abby Dobson ("Baby") and Lara Goodridge ("Lulu"). Their album Album Deux was nominated for 2015 ARIA Award for Best World Music Album.

Members
Abby Dobson
Lara Goodridge

Discography

Albums

Awards and nominations

AIR Awards
The Australian Independent Record Awards (commonly known informally as AIR Awards) is an annual awards night to recognise, promote and celebrate the success of Australia's Independent Music sector.

! 
|-
| 2022
| Album Trois
| Best Independent Jazz Album or EP
| 
|

ARIA Music Awards
The ARIA Music Awards is an annual awards ceremony that recognises excellence, innovation, and achievement across all genres of Australian music. They commenced in 1987.

! 
|-
| 2015
| Album Deux
| ARIA Award for Best World Music Album
| 
| 
|-

References

External links
Baby et Lulu

21st-century Australian women singers
Living people
Year of birth missing (living people)